2006 Kulgam massacre was the killing of nine Nepalese and Bihari labourers and a Muslim Kashmiri Indian Army soldier by Hizbul Mujahideen militants in a broad daylight near Yaripora in Kulgam area of Anantnag district in Kashmir on 12 June 2006.

Background

The group of labourers consisted of 9 Hindus and 1 Muslim (whom the terrorists did not kill). They had come to Kashmir from Siliguri as they had heard that wages were good.  They were hired to build a wall around a house in Hangalbuch.  On the morning of the massacre it had been raining and they took an early break for lunch.  A local Muslim Abdullah Teli was cooking lunch for them.

The Attack

The seven unidentified gunmen wearing combat fatigues, kidnapped Mushtaq Ahmed Sheikh a newly recruited soldier of Rashtriya Rifles and thirteen Nepali and Bihari labourers.  Later they tortured and beheaded Sheikh.  The labourers were lined up and asked to undress.  One of them Mahammad Naimuddin was identified as a Muslim and asked to step aside. Then the labourers were fired on indiscriminately leading to the death of nine of them.   "I begged them not to do it," said Teli, breaking down as he recounts what happened in the minutes before the massacre. "I told them that these were simple working men who had done no wrong. But they just wouldn't listen. They marched out all those men, and a little while later, I heard the shots."

The aftermath
300 Muslims of Kulgam witnessed the funerals.  None of the prominent politicians were present.  The police claimed that the pro-Pakistan terrorist organization, Hizbul Mujahideen was believed to be responsible for the attack.  However, in 2007 Australian government in declaring Lashkar-e-Taiba a Terrorist organisation also attributed this massacre jointly to it.

References

21st-century mass murder in India
Mass murder in 2006
Human rights abuses in Jammu and Kashmir
Persecution of Hindus
Persecution by Muslims
Massacres of Hindus in Kashmir
Terrorist incidents in India in 2006
Islamic terrorism in India
2006 in India
Massacres in Jammu and Kashmir
Anantnag district
2000s in Jammu and Kashmir
Religiously motivated violence in India
Islamic terrorist incidents in 2006